Miłosz Bochat (born 19 December 1995) is a Polish badminton player. He started his career in MLKS Solec Kujawski club and entered the national team in 2010. In 2018, he joined ABRM Warszawa club. Bochat competed at the 2015 and 2019 European Games.

Achievements

BWF International Challenge/Series (5 titles, 7 runners-up) 
Men's doubles

Mixed doubles

  BWF International Challenge tournament
  BWF International Series tournament
  BWF Future Series tournament

Notes

References

External links 
 

1995 births
Living people
Sportspeople from Bydgoszcz
Polish male badminton players
Badminton players at the 2015 European Games
Badminton players at the 2019 European Games
European Games competitors for Poland